Shabtai Konorti (December 13, 1943 – May 27, 2002) was an Israeli actor.

Biography
Born in Bulgaria, Konorti moved to Israel with his family at the age of six. He studied at the Municipal High School in Tel Aviv before serving in the IDF. He then went on to study acting at the Nissan Nativ Acting Studio. Konorti took an interest in stage acting and he was one of the people involved in the creation of the Jerusalem Khan Theatre. He also worked at the Ohel Theatre and the Habima Theatre where he starred in stage adaptations of Man Equals Man, The Government Inspector and more.

On screen, Konorti appeared several times on the satirical television program Zehu Ze!. He made several film appearances as well, including a short cameo appearance as a mechanic in the 1993 film Schindler's List directed by Steven Spielberg.

Personal life
Konorti was briefly married to the singer Suki Lahav during the 1970s and he also has one daughter from another relationship. His half-brother is the painter Benny Desha.

Death
In August 2001, Konorti was involved in a severe car accident which left him mortally injured and placed in a coma. He succumbed to his injuries on May 27th the following year at the age of 58 and was interred at Yarkon Cemetery.

References

External links

1943 births
2002 deaths
Male actors from Tel Aviv
Bulgarian emigrants to Israel
Israeli people of Bulgarian-Jewish descent
Jewish Israeli male actors
Bulgarian Jews in Israel
Israeli male film actors
Israeli male television actors
Israeli male stage actors
20th-century Israeli male actors
21st-century Israeli male actors
Road incident deaths in Israel
Burials at Yarkon Cemetery